Lee Sun-ho (born January 21, 1981), mononymously credited as Andy, is a South Korean singer, rapper and the youngest member of six-member boy band Shinhwa. Besides rapping for his band, Andy has ventured out into television acting, musicals, and solo singing. Andy is also the producer of duo Jumper and boy group Teen Top, 100% and UP10TION.

Biography

Pre-debut
Andy Lee was raised in the San Fernando Valley area of Los Angeles, California, United States and had been a student at John F. Kennedy High School before moving to Seoul. He then completed high school at Korea Kent Foreign School in Seoul.  Lee was the second member to join Shinhwa. He originally planned to be a member of H.O.T. (another Korean boy band) with his friend Tony Ahn. However, his parents pulled their support for him joining H.O.T. because they thought he was too young. Nevertheless, he continued to stay with the management of H.O.T. and was even featured as a rapper on female group S.E.S.'s single I'm Your Girl along with Eric Mun (Mun would later join Lee in Shinhwa as lead rapper).

When Andy was older, his parents let him join Shinhwa. He would continue with Shinhwa until the group's fourth album when he took some time out to study in the U.S. (he later confessed that it actually was due to his care for seriously sick mother). For the group's fifth album Perfect Man he returned and has been with the group ever since.  His real English name was actually Jason, but SM Entertainment persuaded him to change it before his debut.

2003: Solo artist
In 2003, when the members of Shinhwa began doing solo activities, Lee surprised everyone by being an actor on various dramas, most notably the drama Lovers In Prague. Although he had a very minor role in the drama, it gained many viewers because of his role as a completely different, serious person.  He began appearing in many banjun drama as well alongside former Fin.K.L member Lee Jin.  The two acted together in numerous other banjun dramas as well as a couple for 6 months, longer than any other couple or actors/actresses did on the show segment for which they gained a lot of popularity due to their perfect match and chemistry. Lee was also an MC on SBS Inkigayo and MBC Goldfish, though in January 2007, he step down from being MC on both SBS Inkigayo and MBC Goldfish in a period of 3 days (SBS Inkigayo on January 28 & MBC Goldfish on January 31).

In 2007, Lee left his group's management to set up his own company, ND (New Dream) Entertainment, concentrating on his solo career.  As Shinhwa was on hiatus, Lee return to acting in September 2007 to act as the lead role in a musical "Music In My Heart (Season 3)", a type of project that none of the Shinhwa members have tried to pursue yet.  After finishing performances for the musical, Lee released his very first digital single, titled "Irrelevant [or Extraordinary] Imagination" on November 30, 2007, a cover from the group Rollercoaster's song.  Due to the help of Park Jin Young (also known as JYP; CEO of JYP Entertainment) and Yubin of Wonder Girls, Lee was able to have a successful single.  Yubin rapped while JYP wrote the lyrics for the rap part in the song.  With the help, Lee was able to attract a lot of attention for the single.  By releasing the digital single as well, Lee became the 5th member in Shinhwa to go solo behind Lee Min-woo, Shin Hye-sung, Jun Jin, and Kim Dong-wan, leaving Eric Mun as the only member to have not yet pursue a solo singing career.

In March 2008, Andy joined MBC's reality show We Got Married where he was a couple with singer Solbi to act out the lives of newlyweds. Solbi and Andy made their official exit from We Got Married on October 5, 2008. He has taken an active career in stage such as playing as playing a 19-year-old in the musical Polaroid in August 2008, as well as live concerts throughout September and October. He has also produced a two-member boy band called Jumper under his company ND Entertainment. They have released two singles titled YES! featuring Eric and 눈이부셔 (Sparkling Eyes) featuring Kang Jiyoung of Kara.

2009-2011: Military service
In November 2009, Lee commenced an Asia tour with stops in Taipei, Tokyo and Shanghai and concluded it just after Christmas and held a fan meeting, Andy Farewell Party-Bye for now a week before his enlistment. He enlisted for his mandatory military service on 11 January 2010 for 21 months of active duty at the Ministry of National Defense in Yongsan-gu, Seoul. He was discharged on 31 October 2011.

In 2010, TOP Media, Andy's agency, debuted its first boy band Teen Top.

2012: Shinhwa comeback and boy band 100%
In March 2012, Lee reunited with his Shinhwa bandmates for their comeback after four years, under the management of 'Shinhwa Company'. It is a joint venture agency for members to perform as a group, of which Eric and Lee Min-woo are co-CEOs and the remaining members are shareholders. The Company manages the group as a whole, whilst members' individual activities are managed by their respective agencies. The group released their tenth studio album The Return on 23 March 2012, launched their comeback concerts 2012 Shinhwa Grand Tour: The Return throughout Asia and their first exclusive variety program Shinhwa Broadcast premiered on 17 March 2012 on cable channel JTBC.

In September, under TOP Media, he launched a new seven-member boy band 100% which debuted with the hit single "Bad Guy".

2013: Gambling conviction and hiatus
In November 2013, Lee was indicted with illegally gambling on soccer matches, resulting in a fine of 5 million KRW. Shinhwa apologized on-air for Lee's crime in December 2013 and Lee withdrew from all individual and group activities. As part of the hiatus, Lee's previously filmed appearances on broadcast shows such as "Shinhwa Broadcast" were edited out. In February 2014, television station Munhwa Broadcasting Corporation (MBC) announced Lee would be banned from broadcasting on the network.

In October 2014, Lee was announced to be returning with his group mates in a Chinese concert that was broadcast on Seoul Broadcasting System (SBS) Inkigayo in January 2015. Soon after Shinhwa announced its February 2015 comeback with a full-length album, MBC announced it is lifting the ban on Lee.

Personal life 
On January 19, 2022, Andy wrote a letter announcing his marriage, posting it on his personal SNS. Andy's fiancée is announcer Lee Eun-joo of Jeju MBC, who is 9 years younger than him.

On January 25, 2022, it was confirmed that Lee will be married on June 12, 2022.

Discography

Studio albums

Singles

DVD

Filmography

Film

Television series

Variety shows

MC

Musical

Awards

Notes
 A  The Gaon Music Chart began releasing data in 2010 after the Music Industry Association of Korea stopped compiling data in 2008. Online sources for charts after September 2008 and before January 2010 are currently unavailable.

References

External links

  

1981 births
Living people
Shinhwa members
South Korean male television actors
South Korean male musical theatre actors
South Korean male idols
Place of birth missing (living people)
Rappers from Seoul
South Korean male rappers
South Korean pop singers
Male actors from Seoul